Hilmi Sözer (born 9 March 1970) is a Turkish-German actor.

Filmography

Television

References

External links

Official website

1965 births
Living people
Turkish emigrants to West Germany
German people of Turkish descent
German male television actors
Turkish male television actors
German male film actors
Turkish male film actors
Male actors from Ankara
People from Viersen (district)